Operation MBBS, is an Indian Hindi language Medical Drama-Comedy web series directed by Amrit Raj Gupta and written by Puneet Batra, Ayesh Nair and Praveen yadav for Dice media,  it shows the story of three MBBS students played by Ayush Mehra, Anshul Chauhan and Sarah Hashmi.

Premise 
Operation MBBS explores the life of three medical students who come from different backgrounds, in a MBBS college. It follows a growing friendship between the three main characters and hardships of aspiring doctors.

Cast 

 Ayush Mehra as Nishant Singh 
 Anshul Chauhan as Sakshi 
 Sarah Hashmi as Huma 
 Geetanjali Kulkarni as Dean sadhna
 Prateek pachauri as Ketan chotai
 Prateek pachori as KC bhaiya
 Sagar kale as Aakash's father 
 Deepak simwal as Aakash
 Aditi sanwal as Lata 
 Rahul tewari as Pravin 
 Shushant shetty as Yash 
 Mohit doultani as Jugal 
 Momita jaisi 
 Sachin kathuria
 Priya tandon as Chaaru 
 Karan thakur as professor
 Ajay jadav as Dr Nikkam 
 Nazneen madan as Dr Kulkarni

Episodes

Series Overview

Season 1 
There are total 5 episodes in season 1 of Operation MBBS.

Season 2 
Season 2 of Operation MBBS was realised 1 year after the 1st season on March 15, 2021. It explores the 2nd year of MBBS of Nishant, Sakshi and Huma.

References 

Indian drama web series
2020 web series debuts